Zotique Racicot, baptized François-Théophile-Zotique, (October 13, 1845 – September 14, 1915) was a Canadian Roman Catholic priest and Auxiliary Bishop of Montreal from 1905 to 1915.

St. Zotique Street in Montreal was probably named in his honour. The name Zotique (Zoticus in Latin) is derived from the Greek adjective zotikos, meaning "of life".

References

External links
 Catholic-Hierarchy profile

1845 births
1915 deaths
20th-century Roman Catholic bishops in Canada
People from Montréal-Nord